Kirill Gerasimov (born June 5, 1971 in Moscow, Soviet Union) is a Russian professional poker player.

Personal life
Gerasimov worked as an insurance salesman in Moscow, and started entering poker tournaments throughout Europe in 2001. Gerasimov was mentored in poker by professional Marcel Lüske. Gerasimov himself went on to mentor former tennis professional Yevgeny Kafelnikov in poker as well as Mikhail Lakhitov.

Poker career

World Poker Tour
The Paradise Poker website backed Gerasimov in the World Poker Tour season 1 $25,000 championship event, where he finished runner-up to Alan Goehring to take home a $506,625 prize. Since he became a noted player for this runner-up finish, many people have noted he has similar facial characteristics to actor Matt Damon, who played the lead role in the 1998 poker film Rounders.

World Heads-Up Poker Championship
In June 2002, he won the second World Heads-Up Poker Championship in Vienna, winning the €60,000 grand prize.

World Series of Poker
In May 2003, Gerasimov made his first World Series of Poker (WSOP) final table, finishing in 6th place in the $1,500 No Limit Hold-Em event and receiving a $24,000 prize. Other finalists in the tournament included eventual winner Amir Vahedi and other professionals T. J. Cloutier, and Brad Daugherty.

In April 2004, Gerasimov returned to the WSOP and again made two final tables: a 5th-place finish ($30,060) in the $1,500 Pot Limit Hold-Em event featuring 1996 Main Event champion Huck Seed and Tony Bloom, and a 2nd-place finish ($100,000) in the $1,500 No Limit Hold-Em shootout event featuring John Juanda and Daniel Negreanu.

Gerasimov cashed four times in the 2005 World Series of Poker, including a 2nd-place finish ($108,775) in the seven-card stud tournament, and he cashed in the $10,000 Main Event World Championship for the first time, with his 444th-place finish earning $16,055.

At the 2008 World Series of Poker, Gerasimov  made two final tables, 5th in the $5,000 Pot-Limit Omaha w/ Rebuys, earning $192,870 won by Phil Galfond and 6th in the $2,000 No Limit Hold'em event, earning $177,111 and he slightly bested his 2005 Main Event run (444th place) when he finished in 439th place out of 6,844 entries, earning $27,020.

Gerasimov is known in poker circles for making one of the most amazing calls in WSOP history when after thinking his opponent had checked he in turn checked and then showed his opponent his hand which consisted of a ten-high, missed flush draw.  His opponent then claimed that he himself had not checked and after a floor ruling was allowed to bet.  He bet all in and Gerasimov, feeling that this was a bluff, called winning the pot with his ten high.

European Poker Tour
Gerasimov made two final tables during the second season of the European Poker Tour (EPT), finishing in 5th-place in London and 3rd-place in Deauville.

Poker earnings
As of 2014, Gerasimov's live tournament winnings exceed $2,400,000. His 28 cashes at the WSOP account for $1,375,748 of those winnings. Prior to Alex Kravchenko's 2007 performance at the WSOP, Gerasimov was number one on the Russian all-time winning list.

References

External links 
 Kirill Gerasimov, The Rookie from the Red Square (interview by Jennifer Young)
 World Poker Tour profile
 Hendon Mob tournament results
 "The Steady Growth of a Likeable Russian" (by Rolf Slotboom). Card Player Europe.

Russian poker players
Sportspeople from Moscow
1971 births
Living people